Zhenglan (Xulun Hoh) Banner, also known as Plain Blue Banner or Shuluun Huh Banner, (Mongolian:   , , Khalkha: Шулуун хөх хошуу, Shuluun höh hoshuu) is a banner of Inner Mongolia, China, bordering Hebei province to the south. It is under the administration of Xilin Gol League. Xanadu or Yuan Shangdu, one of the capitals of the Yuan dynasty, was located here. Today the ruins of Yuan Shangdu are listed as UNESCO world heritage site and are open to the public.

Climate

References

www.xzqh.org 

Banners of Inner Mongolia